Hypercompe kennedyi is a moth of the family Erebidae first described by Walter Rothschild in 1910. It is found in Minas Gerais, Brazil.

References

Hypercompe
Moths described in 1910